Eggern is a town in the district of Gmünd in the Austrian state of Lower Austria.

Geography
Eggern lies in the northern Waldviertel in Lower Austria. About 36.77 percent of the municipality is forested.

References

External links
Municipal website

Cities and towns in Gmünd District